Harpalus katiae is a species of ground beetle in the subfamily Harpalinae. It was described by F.Battoni in 1985.

References

katiae
Beetles described in 1985